Washington Township is one of eleven townships in Monroe County, Indiana, United States. As of the 2010 census, its population was 2,029 and it contained 882 housing units.  The township contains a portion of the Morgan-Monroe State Forest.

History
Washington Township was established in 1829. It was named for George Washington, the first President of the United States.

Geography

Unincorporated towns
 Hindustan at 
 Modesto at 
 Wayport at 
(This list is based on USGS data and may include former settlements.)

Cemeteries
The township contains these two cemeteries: Collier and Sample.

Major highways
 Interstate 69
  Indiana State Road 37

Lakes
 Bryant Creek Lake

School districts
 Monroe County Community School Corporation

Political districts
 Indiana's 9th congressional district
 State House District 61
 State Senate District 37

References
 
 United States Census Bureau 2008 TIGER/Line Shapefiles
 IndianaMap

External links
 City-Data.com page for Washington Township

Townships in Monroe County, Indiana
Bloomington metropolitan area, Indiana
Townships in Indiana